The judo competition at the 2007 All-Africa Games were held in Algiers, Algeria on 14 July 2007.

Medal overview

Men

Women

Medal table

Results overview

Men

60 kg

66 kg

73 kg

81 kg

90 kg

100 kg

+100 kg

Open class

Women

48 kg

52 kg

57 kg

63 kg

70 kg

78 kg

+78 kg

Open class

External links
 

A
2007 All-Africa Games
2007
African Games